Sacred space, sacred ground, sacred place, sacred temple, holy ground, or holy place refers to a location which is deemed to be sacred or hallowed. The sacredness of a  natural feature may accrue through tradition or be granted through a blessing. One or more religions may consider sacred locations to be of special significance. Often, such locations either are or become the home of  sanctuaries, shrines, places of worship, or locations conducive to meditation. Regardless of construction or use, these areas may have a variety of ritual or taboo associations – including limitations on visitors or on allowed actions within the space. Such places may become the focus of pilgrimage, drawing pilgrims from great distances, or simply locations of significance for the

See also

 Sacred related 
 Holy Land
 Tirtha (Hinduism)
 Sapta Puri
 Australian Aboriginal sacred site
 Sacred trees
 Bodhi Tree
 List of Banyan trees in India
 Sacred groves
 Sacred groves of India
 Trees in mythology
 Tree worship
 Sacred mountains
 Sacred natural site
 

 General
 Axis mundi
 Earth mysteries
 Hierotopy
 
 List of religious sites
 Numen
 Sanctum sanctorum
 Sacred–profane dichotomy
 Sacred architecture

Further reading 

 Bain, George. Celtic Art: The Methods of Construction. Dover, 1973. .
 Bamford, Christopher. Homage to Pythagoras: Rediscovering Sacred Science, Lindisfarne Press, 1994, .
 Calian, George. Sacred Spaces in Motion, RES, 2021, .
 Schneider, Michael S.: A Beginner's Guide to Constructing the Universe: Mathematical Archetypes of Nature, Art, and Science. Harper Paperbacks, 1995. .
 Pennick, Nigel: Beginnings: Geomancy, Builders' Rites and Electional Astrology in the European Tradition .
 Pennick, Nigel: Sacred Geometry: Symbolism and Purpose in Religious Structures.